The Ruppert Archaeopteryx is a Swiss high-wing, pod-and-boom, single-seat, microlift glider that was designed by Roger Ruppert and is produced by Ruppert Composite GmbH.

The aircraft is named for the feathered Archaeopteryx dinosaur.

Design and development
The Archaeopteryx was conceived as a foot-launchable microlift sailplane, with the design goals of a light empty weight, low stall speed with gentle stall characteristics, good maneuverability and good high speed performance. A further goal was a sailplane that could be foot-launched in zero wind conditions.

The Archaeopteryx design started in 1998 at the Zurich University of Applied Sciences (ZHAW) as a research project. The first flight of the initial prototype was in September 2001. Based on initial lessons the prototype was modified and reflown in May 2002. Further flight tests and modifications were carried out, with the prototype re-flying in its new form in March 2003. The production prototype design was started in 2006 and completed in 2009. The first series production started in the summer of 2009 and production deliveries to customers commenced in May 2010. By the summer of 2021, 18 aircraft had been delivered to customers in Australia, Argentina, Germany, France, Austria and Switzerland.

The controls are conventional, with a stick for ailerons and elevator and rudder pedals. The aircraft uses flaps for glidepath control, which function as airbrakes when set to 45-70 degrees. The aircraft can be rigged for flight by one person in 15 minutes. It has been launched by foot, aero-tow, bungee launch, auto-tow and winch-launch and has been landed on its wheel and foot-landed as well.

The company further developed a prototype equipped with two electric motors to provide self-launch capability. This prototype did not have satisfactory performance, and a single electric motor version was developed instead. This
electric propulsion was introduced in mid-2014 to allow self-launching. About two dozen have been sold (and some were retrofitted to earlier sold models). It can run at full power for 11 minutes on one charge. The electrical motor uses 10.5 kW at 3800 rpm, and the propeller delivers 370 N when flying at 75 km/h. Storage is a 14s1p lithium polymer battery (Kokam) with 40 Ah capacity, delivering 2.07 kWh, maximum 58.8 V and maximum continuous current of 200 amps.

Variants
Archaeopteryx Standard
Basic design without cockpit fairing
Archaeopteryx Performance
Basic design, with cockpit fairing; no longer in production
Archaeopteryx Race
Basic design, with cockpit fairing and windshield
Archaeopteryx Electro
Race version with electrical propulsion

Specifications (Standard)

See also

References

External links

Archaeopteryx foot launch at YouTube
Archaeopteryx bungee launch at YouTube
Archaeopteryx landing at YouTube
Archaeopteryx Electro take-off and landing at YouTube

2000s Swiss sailplanes
Sailplanes designed for foot-launching
High-wing aircraft
Aircraft first flown in 2001